Serbs and Montenegrins (Serbs-Montenegrins) are an ethno-linguistic community in Albania. They are one of the recognized national minorities. The population was concentrated in the region of Vraka, but largely emigrated in the 1990s. The community is bilingual and by majority adhere to Eastern Orthodoxy, while a minority professes Islam. The majority of the Serbo-Montenegrin community came to Albania from Montenegro during the interwar Zogist period following 1926 and later from 1938 until 1948. In the latest census (2011) which was boycotted by Serb-Montenegrin minority organizations, 366 citizens declared themselves as Montenegrins and 142 as Serbs. According to independent monitoring, the population numbers around 2,000.

Terminology 
The community is commonly known as Serbs-Montenegrins (Montenegrin/), "Serbs" or "Montenegrins".
It has also been called the Serbo-Montenegrin minority by the Council of Europe or simply Serbo-Montenegrins.

Demographics 

In the late 19th and 20th century, of the 600-700 people of the Orthodox faith living in the city of Shkodër, some 500-600 were Serbo-Montenegrins. The area of Vraka had a population of 600-700 Orthodox Slavophones.

During the first World War occupying Austro-Hungarian forces conducted a census (1916-1918) of parts of Albania they held. Of the area corresponding to the contemporary wider Shkodër region, settlements that listed Slavophone populations within them had the following ethnic and religious demographics:

Koplik (12 settlements counted as one) - 199 households, 1429 people: 1427 Albanians, 2 Serbo-Croats; 2 Orthodox, 1427 Muslims.
Buza e Ujit (with the settlements Flakë, Jubicë, Kalldrun, Kamicë, Stërbicë counted as part of the village) - 117 households, 755 people: 677 Albanians, 78 Serbo-Croats; 167 Catholics, 86 Orthodox, 502 Muslims.
Boriç (Boriç i Ri and Boriç i Vjetër counted as one settlement) - 61 households, 482 people: 482 Albanians; 3 Catholics, 479 Orthodox.
Grilë - 28 households, 205 people: 1 Albanian, 204 Serbo-Croats; 1 Catholic, 204 Orthodox. 
Rrash-Kullaj - 10 households, 122 people: 122 Albanians; 122 Orthodox.
Omaraj - 25 households, 153 people: 5 Albanians, 148 Serbo-Croats; 4 Catholics, 148 Orthodox, 1 Muslim.
Rrash - 9 households, 102 people: 102 Albanians; 83 Orthodox, 19 Muslims.
Shtoj - 35 households, 166 people: 166 Serbo-Croats; 7 Catholics, 159 Muslims.
Tarabosh - 19 households, 197 people (including Romani): 19 Albanians, 24 Serbo-Croats; 2 Catholics, 7 Orthodox, 188 Muslims.
Sukat e Vezirit - 20 households, 164 people, 161 Albanians, 3 Serbo-Croats; 6 Catholics, 2 Orthodox, 155 Muslims.

Linguists Klaus Steinke and Xhelal Ylli consider the overall census results to be first instance of reliable information on the number of households and inhabitants as well as the ethnic and religious composition of these places. Both linguists however note that the data for Boriç and Rrash-Kullaj are somewhat unclear as the inhabitants are referred to there as both Albanians and Orthodox.

In the Albanian census of 1989, there was no accurate data about the minority population of Vraka.

In the early 1990s, scholar Slobodan Šćepanović resorted to collecting information through interviews with individual Albanian immigrants and Albanian citizens of the region that came to Yugoslavia. Without specifying the sources, he gave the following "present" figures:

At the time in Shkodër County, the Vraka region is where most of the community lived:
Boriç i Vogël (Stari/Mali Borič), majority of Serbs–Montenegrins (67 households) and minority of Albanians (8 households)
Boriç i Madh (Mladi/Veliki Borič), majority of Slavic Muslims (Podgoriçani) hailing from Podgorica (86 families) and minorities of Albanians (20 families) and Serbs–Montenegrins (6 families)
Grilë (Grilj), majority of Serbs–Montenegrins (76 households) and minority of Albanians (9 households)
Omaraj (Omara), majority of Serbs–Montenegrins (68 households) and minority of Albanians (11 households)
Rrash-Kullaj (Raš i Kule), was inhabited by Serbs–Montenegrins until World War II when the whole population emigrated to Yugoslavia

The official statistics of the Albanian government (early 1990s) placed the Montenegrin community at 100, as some Albanian government officials stated that those numbers were accurate due to 700 of them leaving Albania during the democratisation process. The Association of Montenegrins (AM), a social-cultural organisation founded in Vraka claimed some 1,000 members that represented the interests of a community of 2,500 people located in Shkodër and the surrounding area. AM during that time urged the Albanian government to recognise the Montenegrin and Serb communities in Albania and allow certain linguistic, education, cultural and other rights. In 1999 the Helsinki Committee for Human rights in Albania conducted surveys of the Shkodër region and estimated that there were some 1800-2000 Serbian-speakers in the area. In 2000, the Albanian Helsinki Committee estimated that there were ca. 2,000 "Serb–Montenegrin" people in Albania.

In the mid-2000s, scholar Nikolai Genov estimated the minority community of Vraka to number some 2,000 people.

Serbo-Montenegrin minority organizations, along with organizations from other minority groups, boycotted the 2011 census over disagreements on how ethnic and religious declarations were handled and other issues. Official statistics counted 366 Montenegrins and 142 Serbs.

During the early 2010s linguists Klaus Steinke and Xhelal Ylli seeking to corroborate villages cited in past literature as being Slavic speaking carried out fieldwork in settlements of the area. Of the Shkodër area exists seven villages with a Slavophone population that speak a Montenegrin dialect.

 Boriç i Madh - one third of the population is compact and composed of Muslim Podgoriçani. 
 Boriç i Vogël - inhabited by 15 families and the Slavophone families are the only compact group of the Orthodox in Vraka.  
 Grilë - the village officially has 1,090 inhabitants or 195 families, whereas the number of Orthodox Montenegrin families ranges between two, three to ten. An Albanian school exists in Grilë along with a newly built Orthodox church that is without a priest. According to Slavophone locals, the Orthodox population moved from Montenegro to Darragjat, due to blood feuds and later between 1935 and 1936, they relocated themselves to the Vraka area in places such as Grilë. Some Orthodox Montenegrins from the village moved to Montenegro in the 1990s with some thereafter returning to Grilë.  
 Omaraj - in the village only two Orthodox Montenegrin families remain. 
 Kamicë - the village is almost deserted, with five or six minority Orthodox Montenegrin families left, alongside the few Albanian families.
 Shtoj i Ri - the village has a compact population of 17 Muslim Podgoriçani families.  
 Shtoj i Vjetër - the village has a compact population of 30 Muslim Podgoriçani families.
 Shkodër (city) - some Orthodox Montenegrin and Muslim Podgoriçani families live there.

History

Medieval Period

With short interruptions, the territory that later became a part of Sanjak of Scutari in the Ottoman Empire, belonged to the Serbian medieval feudal states for many centuries. According to Emperor Constantine VII (r. 913–959) the early Serbs lived in the former Roman provinces of Dalmatia, Praevalitana and Moesia. During the rule of Časlav Klonimirović (r. 927–960), all of Albania was part of Bulgarian Empire (eastern) and the Byzantine Empire (Dyrrhachium (theme), western maritime). After the Byzantine annexation of Raška, the Serbian principality of Duklja succeeded as the main Serb state and it included much of the land north of Durrës, with Shkodër being an important city. Emperor Samuel of Bulgaria (r. 997–1014) had by 997 conquered all of Thessaly, Epirus, Macedonia, and most of modern Albania.

Jovan Vladimir ruled Duklja during the war between Byzantine Emperor Basil II and Samuel. Vladimir allegedly retreated into Koplik when Samuel invaded Duklja, and was subsequently forced to accept Bulgarian vassalage. Vladimir was later slewn by the Bulgars, and received a cult; Shingjon (the feast of St. Jovan Vladimir), which is celebrated by the Albanian Orthodox Christians. In 1018 Basil II conquered most of the Balkans and established the Archbishopric of Ohrid for the South Slavs. In the 1030s, Stefan Vojislav expelled the last strategos and defeated the Byzantines (1042), then set up Shkodër (Skadar) as his capital.  

Constantine Bodin accepted the crusaders of the Crusade of 1101 in Shkodër. After the dynastic struggles in the 12th century, Shkodër became part of the Nemanjić Zeta province. In 1330 Stefan Uroš III appointed his son Stefan Dušan as the "Young King" and ruler of Zeta seated in Shkodër.  According to the Chronicle of the Priest of Duklja, several Serbian rulers and members of the Vojislavljević dynasty of Duklja were buried in the Shirgj Church on the Bojana river, founded by Helen of Anjou, queen consort of Serbian Kingdom (1245–1276), such as Constantine Bodin, Mihailo I, Dobroslav, Vladimir and Gradinja.

During the fall of the Serbian Empire (14th century), Shkodër was taken by the Balšić family of Zeta who surrendered the city to Venice, in order to form protection zone from the Ottoman Empire. During Venetian rule the city adopted the Statutes of Scutari, a civic law written in Venetian, which also contained Albanian elements such as Besa and Gjakmarrja. Principality of Zeta, a former Ottoman vassal, lost its status as an independent state and was largely incorporated into the Sanjak of Scutari in 1499. In 1514, this territory was separated from the Sanjak of Scutari and established as a separate sanjak, under the rule of Skenderbeg Crnojević. When he died in 1528, the Sanjak of Montenegro was reincorporated into the Sanjak of Scutari as a unique administrative unit (vilayet) with certain degree of autonomy.

Modern

During the Montenegrin–Ottoman War (1876–78), the Montenegrin army managed to capture certain areas and settlements along the border, and incorporated them into the state such as the town of Podgorica that had a significant Slavic Muslim population. The Muslim population of Podgorica fled and Slavic Muslims from the town migrated and resettled in Shkodër city and its environs. From 1878 onward a small Muslim Montenegrin speaking community living near Shkodër exists and are known as Podgoriçani, due to their origins from Podgorica in Montenegro.

In the late Ottoman period, the French consul of Shkodër noted the sentiments of the people of Vraka wanting to be united with Montenegro, though this was not achievable due to the distance of Vraka from the then border.

During the interwar period, relations between King Zog and Yugoslavia were less problematic and Yugoslav-Albanian borders allowed for the free movement of populations. The majority of the Serbo-Montenegrin community came to Albania from Montenegro during the interwar Zogist period following 1926 and later from 1938 until 1948. At the time Vraka contained poor land and was still an undeveloped area.  Unlike the Albanian inhabitants of the area, the new population from Montenegro had skills in operating the iron plough and motor vehicles to cultivate the land.

The Serbian minority in Scutari had celebrated its liturgy in Serbian. The Serbian Metropolitan of Scutari participated in the Albanian Synod.

Vraka is known for having been the place where poet Millosh Gjergj Nikolla became teacher on 23 April 1933, and it was in this period that he started to write prose sketches and verses.

Socialist Albania (1944–1992)
As part of assimilation politics during the rule of communist regime in Albania, Serb-Montenegrins were not allowed to have Serbian names, especially family names ending with the characteristic suffix "ich".

After the 1981 student protest in Kosovo, Albanian Serbs complained on harassment and pressure to leave the country.

Contemporary
In 1990 most of the minority community of Vraka went to Montenegro. As the border opened up, many members of the community left between March–December 1991 for Montenegro and Vraka, Boriç and other nearby areas became severely depopulated. During that time with economic problems and tensions arising in areas of the former Yugoslavia, it made some 600 of them return home to Albania. The Morača-Rozafa Association was established in 1992.

During the Yugoslav Wars, there were incidents of violence against the Serb-Montenegrin minority in places like Vraka, Boriç i Vogël and Boriç i Madh, where the Albanian government tried to forcibly take land from them. There were reports that the Albanian government also attempted to forcibly resettle Serb-Montenegrins and Podgoriçani from Boriç i Vogël, Boriç i Madh, Vraka and other places.

In March 1992, as part of state policy by Serbia and Montenegro to increase the numbers of Serbs in Kosovo, nearly 3,000 people from the Serb minority in Albania emigrated to the region after accepting a government offer for employment and housing in the area. Another wave came with the Kosovo War.

In the early twenty first century, the community lives largely on trade with Montenegro and communal relations with Albanian inhabitants are regarded as good by many of its members.

Notable people
Stefan Marinović (fl. 1563), Venetian printer, born in Shkodër.
Nikola Musulin (1830–fl. 1897), Serbian teacher who found the Prizren manuscript of Dušan's Code.
George Berovich (1845–1897), Ottoman official, born in Shkodër.
Nikola Vulić (1872–1945), Serbian historian, classical philologist and archaeologist, born in Shkodër, member of SANU.
Kosta Miličević (1877–1920), Serbian painter, born in Vrakë.
Vojo Kushi (1918–1942), Albanian communist, Hero of Albania and Hero of Yugoslavia, born in Shkodër.
Nada Matić, Serbian paralympic table tennis player

See also

Albania-Serbia relations
Demographics of Albania
Albanians in Serbia
Albanians in Montenegro

References

Sources
Reports

External links 
Association of the Serbo-Montenegrin minority in the Republic of Albania "MORAČA-ROZAFA"
 (Documentary in Serbian)
 (Documentary in Serbian)

Albania
Ethnic groups in Albania